Linda Lovelace (born Linda Susan Boreman; January 10, 1949 – April 22, 2002) was an American pornographic actress who became famous for her performance in the 1972 hardcore film Deep Throat. Although the film was an enormous success, Boreman later said that her abusive husband, Chuck Traynor, had threatened and coerced her into participation. In her autobiography Ordeal, she described what went on behind the scenes. She later became a born-again Christian and a spokeswoman for the anti-pornography movement.

Early life
Boreman was born January 10, 1949, in The Bronx, New York City, New York, into a working-class family. She described her upbringing in an unhappy family, as the daughter of John Boreman, a police officer who was seldom home, and Dorothy Boreman (née Tragney), a waitress who was harsh, unloving, and domineering. She attended private Catholic schools, including Saint John the Baptist (Yonkers, New York) and Maria Regina High School. Linda was nicknamed "Miss Holy Holy" in high school because she kept her dates at a safe distance to avoid sexual activity. When Boreman was 16, her family moved to Davie, Florida, after her father retired from the New York City Police Department.

At the age of 20, she gave birth to her first child born out-of-wedlock, whom her mother tricked her into putting up for adoption. Shortly afterwards, she returned to New York City to live and go to computer school. There, she was involved in an automobile accident, sustaining injuries that were serious enough to require her to undergo a blood transfusion. The transfused blood had not been properly screened for hepatitis contamination, which caused her to need a liver transplant 18 years later.

Career

Pornography
While recovering at the home of her parents, Boreman became involved with Chuck Traynor. According to Boreman, Traynor was charming and attentive at first, then became violent and abusive. She said he forced her to move to New York, where he became her manager, pimp, and husband.

Allegedly coerced by Traynor, Boreman was soon performing as Linda Lovelace in hardcore "loops", short 8 mm silent films made for peep shows.

Boreman starred in a 1969 bestiality film titled Dogarama (also known as Dog Fucker). She later denied having appeared in the film until several of the original loops proved otherwise. In 2013, Larry Revene, the cameraman who actually shot the film, spoke about it for the first time, during which he asserted that Boreman was a willing participant and that no coercion took place. Porn star Eric Edwards, who was present for the shoot, has similarly claimed there was no obvious coercion going on and that Boreman appeared to be a cooperative performer.

In 1971, Boreman also starred in the golden shower film titled Piss Orgy.

In 1972, Boreman starred in Deep Throat, in which she performed deep-throating. The film achieved surprising and unprecedented popularity among mainstream audiences and even a review in The New York Times. It played several times daily for over ten years at theaters in the Pussycat Theater chain, where Boreman did promotions, including leaving her hand and footprints in the concrete sidewalk outside the Hollywood Pussycat. The movie later became one of the first, and highest-grossing, X-rated videotape releases. Deep Throat grossed over $600 million, however Boreman was paid only $1250, which was later confiscated by her husband Traynor.

Media career after Deep Throat
In December 1973, Boreman made her theater debut in Pajama Tops at the Locust Theatre in Philadelphia, Pennsylvania. The production suffered disappointing box office performance, which led it to close early, and Boreman's performance was panned.

In 1974, Boreman starred in the R-rated sequel, Deep Throat II, which was not as well received as the original had been; one critic, writing in Variety, described it as "the shoddiest of exploitation film traditions, a depressing fast buck attempt to milk a naïve public."

In 1975, Boreman left Traynor for David Winters, the producer of her 1975 film Linda Lovelace for President, which co-starred Micky Dolenz. The film showed her on the campaign trail following a cross-country bus route mapped out in the shape of a penis. However, her career as an actress failed to flourish, and her film appearances add up to five hours of screen time. In her 1980 autobiography Ordeal, Lovelace maintained that those films used leftover footage from Deep Throat; however, she frequently contradicted this statement. She also posed for Playboy, Bachelor, and Esquire between 1973 and 1974.

During the mid-1970s, she took to smoking large quantities of marijuana combined with painkillers, and after her second marriage and the birth of her two children, she left the pornographic film business.

In 1974, she published two "pro-porn" autobiographies, Inside Linda Lovelace and The Intimate Diary of Linda Lovelace.

In 1976, she was chosen to play the title role in the erotic movie Forever Emmanuelle (also known as Laure). However, according to the producer Ovidio G. Assonitis, Lovelace was "very much on drugs" at the time. She had already signed for the part when she avowed that "God had changed [her] life", refused to do any nudity, and even objected to a statue of the Venus de Milo on the set because of its exposed breasts. She was replaced by French actress Annie Belle.

In January 1977, she briefly returned to theater acting in a Las Vegas production of My Daughter's Rated X, but the show closed early and her acting performance was criticized.

Charges against Chuck Traynor
In her suit to divorce Traynor, she said that he forced her into pornography at gunpoint and that in Deep Throat bruises from his beatings can be seen on her legs. She said that her husband "would force her to do these things by pointing a rifle at her head." Boreman said in her autobiography that her marriage had been plagued by violence, rape, forced prostitution and private pornography. She wrote in Ordeal:

Boreman's accusations provoked mixed responses. Traynor admitted to striking Lovelace but said it was part of a voluntary sex game. In Legs McNeil's and Jennifer Osborne's 2005 book The Other Hollywood, several witnesses, including Deep Throat director Gerard Damiano, state that Traynor beat Boreman behind closed doors, but they also question her credibility. Eric Edwards, Boreman's co-star in the bestiality films and other loops that featured her urinating on her sex partners, similarly discounts her credibility. According to Edwards, Boreman was a sexual "super freak" who had no boundaries and was a pathological liar. Adult-film actress Gloria Leonard was quoted as saying, "This was a woman who never took responsibility for her own [...] choices made; but instead blamed everything that happened to her in her life on porn." Corroboration for Lovelace's claims came from Andrea True, Lovelace's co-star in Deep Throat 2, who, on a commentary DVD track of the documentary Inside Deep Throat, stated that Traynor was a sadist and was disliked by the Deep Throat 2 cast. Andrea Dworkin stated that the results of polygraph tests administered to Boreman support her assertions. Moreover, psychiatrist Judith Lewis Herman notes that many details in Lovelace's memoir Ordeal are consistent with a diagnosis of Complex PTSD, such as Lovelace's description of a fragmented personality in the aftermath of alleged abuse. Because of the circumstances of her upbringing, however, it had ceased to be clear whether the abuse came from Traynor or from Boreman's parents.

Eric Danville, a journalist who covered the porn industry for nearly 20 years and wrote The Complete Linda Lovelace in 2001, said Boreman never changed her version of events that had occurred 30 years earlier with Traynor. When Danville told Boreman of his book proposal, he said she was overcome with emotion and saddened he had uncovered the bestiality film, which she had initially denied making and later maintained she had been forced to star in at gunpoint.

Boreman maintained that she received no money for Deep Throat and that the $1,250 payment for her appearance was taken by Traynor.

Marriage with Marchiano 

In 1976, Boreman married Larry Marchiano, a cable installer who later owned a drywall business. They had two children, Dominic (born 1977) and Lindsay (born 1980). They lived in Center Moriches, a small town on Long Island. Boreman was then going through the liver transplant that her injuries from the automobile accident had necessitated, owing to the poorly screened blood she received in the transfusions. For a while, marriage and particularly motherhood brought her some stability and happiness. However, Marchiano's business went bankrupt in 1990, and the family moved to Colorado.

In The Other Hollywood, Boreman painted a largely unflattering picture of Marchiano, claiming he drank to excess, verbally abused her children, and was occasionally violent with her. Their divorce in 1996 was civil, and the two remained in contact with each other for the remainder of her life.

Anti-pornography activism
With the publication of Ordeal in 1980, Boreman joined the anti-pornography movement. At a press conference announcing Ordeal, she leveled many of the above-noted accusations against Traynor in public for the first time. She was joined by supporters Andrea Dworkin, Catharine MacKinnon, Gloria Steinem, and members of Women Against Pornography. Boreman spoke out against pornography, stating that she had been abused and coerced. She spoke before feminist groups, at colleges, and at government hearings on pornography.

In 1986, Boreman published Out of Bondage, a memoir focusing on her life after 1974. She testified before the 1986 Attorney General's Commission on Pornography, also called the "Meese Commission", in New York City, stating, "When you see the movie Deep Throat, you are watching me being raped. It is a crime that movie is still showing; there was a gun to my head the entire time." Following Boreman's testimony for the Meese Commission, she gave lectures on college campuses, decrying what she described as callous and exploitative practices in the pornography industry.

Last years and death
Boreman had contracted hepatitis from the blood transfusion she received after her 1970 car accident and underwent a liver transplant in 1987. In 2001, she was featured on E! True Hollywood Story and did a lingerie pictorial as Linda Lovelace for the magazine Leg Show.

On April 3, 2002, Boreman was involved in another automobile accident. This was more serious than the 1970 accident that had injured her. She suffered massive trauma and internal injuries. On April 22, 2002, she was taken off life support and died in Denver, Colorado, at the age of 53. Marchiano and their two children were present when she died. Boreman was interred at Parker Cemetery in Parker, Colorado.

Legacy
The computer processing coordination system Linda was named after Linda Lovelace. This name choice was inspired by the programming language Ada, which was named after computer pioneer Ada Lovelace.

Boreman's participation in Deep Throat was among the topics explored in the 2005 documentary Inside Deep Throat.

Indie pop singer and songwriter Marc with a C released a 2008 album titled Linda Lovelace for President, which contained a song of the same name.

The country songwriter and singer David Allan Coe wrote a song called "Linda Lovelace" which is featured on his 1978 album Nothing Sacred. The same song appears on his 1990 album 18 X-Rated Hits under the title "I Made Linda Lovelace Gag".

In 2008, Lovelace: A Rock Musical, based on two of Boreman's four autobiographies, debuted at the Hayworth Theatre in Los Angeles. The score and libretto were written by Anna Waronker of the 1990s rock group That Dog, and Charlotte Caffey of the 1980s group the Go-Go's.

Lovelace is one of the main characters of the 2010 stage play The Deep Throat Sex Scandal by David Bertolino. The play follows the life and early career of Harry Reems as he enters the pornography industry, eventually filming Deep Throat and its resultant infamy and obscenity trial in Memphis, Tennessee, and Lovelace is a central figure. In July 2013, an Indiegogo crowdfunding campaign to make a film version of the play raised over $25,000.

As of 2011, two biographical films on Boreman were scheduled to begin production. One, titled Lovelace, went into general release on August 9, 2013, with Rob Epstein and Jeffrey Friedman directing, Amanda Seyfried as Lovelace, and Peter Sarsgaard as Chuck Traynor. Lovelace received a limited release in 2013, but ultimately, despite drawing many positive reviews, it was a box-office failure. The other, titled Inferno: A Linda Lovelace Story, starring Malin Åkerman, was to be directed by Matthew Wilder and produced by Chris Hanley and was scheduled to begin filming in early 2011. Due to a lack of financing it never went into production.

Tina Yothers, who was a child actress on Family Ties, was cast as Lovelace in Lovelace: The Musical.

Filmography
 Dogarama (1969)
 Piss Orgy (1971)
 Deep Throat (1972)
 The Confessions of Linda Lovelace (1974)
 Deep Throat Part II (1974) as Nurse Lovelace
 Linda Lovelace for President (1975)

Bibliography
 Inside Linda Lovelace (1974), Linda Lovelace, later seen as a book saying by Chuck 
 Ordeal (1980), Linda Lovelace and Mike McGrady, 
 Out of Bondage (1986), Linda Lovelace and Mike McGrady, 

Other books:
 Jack Stevenson (ed): Fleshpot: Cinema's Sexual Myth Makers & Taboo Breakers (Headpress, England 2000). This features an interview with her.

See also
Women Against Pornography

References

External links
Pussycat Theaters - a Comprehensive History by Jay Allen Sanford, published 6-30-10
Pussycat Theater History - San Diego Reader
Linda Lovelace (1949–2002) @Arlindo-Correia.org– Collection of Linda Lovelace obituaries and other articles.
'Larry Revene: Loops and Organized Crime', The Rialto Report An interview with the cameraman on one of Linda Lovelace's loops.

Deep Throat: Damiano, Lovelace.. and “Lovelace” at The Rialto Report, 8 September 2013

1949 births
2002 deaths
American pornographic film actresses
American feminists
20th-century American memoirists
Anti-pornography activists
Anti-pornography feminists
Liver transplant recipients
Actresses from New York City
People from the Bronx
People from Yonkers, New York
Pornographic film actors from New York (state)
Road incident deaths in Colorado
Animal pornography
Marital rape
American women memoirists
People from Center Moriches, New York
20th-century American actresses